Reidar Kvaal Hjermann (born 17 February 1969) is a Norwegian psychologist and former Children's Ombudsman of Norway.

The son of Ingvar Hjermann, Reidar started working as a psychologist in 1998. In 2004 he was appointed Ombudsman for Children in Norway, succeeding fellow psychologist Trond Waage.

When his four-year term ended in 2008, he applied for a second term. However, the job was given to jurist Ida Hjort Kraby. Later, it was revealed that Kraby had friendly relations with Minister of Children and Equality, Manuela Ramin-Osmundsen. Ramin-Osmundsen withdrew from her position, as did Kraby, who never got the time to formally enter the post. With the ombudsman position open again, Hjermann was then appointed to a second term, where he served until the end of the term in 2012.

References

1969 births
Living people
Norwegian psychologists
Directors of government agencies of Norway
Children's Ombudsmen in Norway
2008 in Norway
People from Bærum